Louis IV or Ludwig IV may refer to:

 Louis the Child, also known as Louis IV (893–911)
 Louis IV of France (920–954)
 Louis IV, Count of Chiny (c. 1173 to 1177–1226)
 Louis IV, Landgrave of Thuringia (1200–1227)
 Louis IV, Count of Looz (died 1336)
 Louis IV, Holy Roman Emperor (1282–1347)
 Louis IV, Elector Palatine (1424–1449)
 Louis IV de Bueil, Comte de Sancerre (died c. 1565)
 Louis IV, Landgrave of Hesse-Marburg (1537–1604)
 Louis IV, Prince of Condé or Louis Henri, Duke of Bourbon (1692–1740)
 Louis IV, Grand Duke of Hesse (1837–1892)